Esther Fennel (born 31 December 1981) is a German former racing cyclist. She was champion of the Bavarian Mountain Championships in 2009 and 2011, and of the North Rhine-Westphalian Road Championships in 2012. She competed in the 2013 UCI women's road race in Florence. Her cycling career finished in 2014.

References

External links
 

1981 births
Living people
German female cyclists
German goldsmiths
20th-century German women
21st-century German women